The following is a list of players, both past and current, who appeared at least in one game for the San Miguel Alab Pilipinas (ABL) franchise.



A

B

C

D

F

G

H

J

K

L

M

O

P

R

S

T

U

V

W

References